Elsenheim is a commune, in the Bas-Rhin department in Alsace in north-eastern France.

Population

See also
 Communes of the Bas-Rhin department

References

Communes of Bas-Rhin